William Charles Terry (born July 13, 1961 in Toronto, Ontario) is a Canadian former professional ice hockey player who played five games in the National Hockey League (NHL) with the Minnesota North Stars during the 1987–88 season. The rest of his career, which lasted from 1984 to 1992, was split between the International Hockey League and time in Germany and Switzerland. As a youth, he played in the 1974 Quebec International Pee-Wee Hockey Tournament with a minor ice hockey team from Wexford, Toronto.

Career statistics

Regular season and playoffs

References

External links
 

1961 births
Living people
Canadian ice hockey centres
Augsburger Panther players
HC Ajoie players
Lausanne HC players
Kalamazoo Wings (1974–2000) players
Michigan Tech Huskies men's ice hockey players
Minnesota North Stars players
Sault Ste. Marie Greyhounds players
SC Herisau players
St. Louis Blues scouts
Ice hockey people from Toronto
Toledo Goaldiggers players
Undrafted National Hockey League players